The Atlético Nacional–Millonarios rivalry is a major rivalry involving Millonarios from Bogotá and Atlético Nacional from Medellín, the two most successful and two of the most popular clubs in Colombian football. Dubbed by Colombian media as well as CONMEBOL as one of the most important clásicos or a "superclásico" of Colombian football, this rivalry is also considered one of the greatest classic matches in South America by the international press. The rivalry is fueled by a social, cultural and regional character, since it evokes the historical rivalry between two of the most developed regions of Colombia: the Antioquia Department (specifically its capital city Medellín) and the nation's capital Bogotá.

This match gained importance starting from the decade of the 80s, at a moment when Millonarios had consolidated themselves as the dominating team in Colombian football and Atlético Nacional began to stand out both in local competition and continental tournaments. Since then, the rivalry between Verdolagas and Embajadores has grown stronger, especially from heated altercations between fans. 

The scope of this rivalry is endorsed by the numerous confrontations with each other, to the point of being one of the games most played in the history of Colombian football, in addition to having faced each other in almost all the competitions they have played, including international tournaments such as the Copa Libertadores de América, Copa Sudamericana and Copa Merconorte. However, the turning point in this rivalry was the 1989 Copa Libertadores quarter-final series between both teams, in which Atlético Nacional eliminated Millonarios on the way to winning their first Copa Libertadores after winning 1–0 in Medellín and drawing 1–1 at Estadio El Campín, with controversial refereeing by Chilean referee Hernán Silva in the second leg, and after accusations that the international referees who had to handle Atlético Nacional games received threats to favor this team. As of 2022, both sides, as well as Santa Fe from Bogotá have been the only teams to have competed in every Categoría Primera A tournament.

History

Early years 
These two clubs met for the first time in the 1948 Campeonato Profesional on Sunday 3 October 1948 in Bogotá, where the Antioquia team (which at that time was called Atlético Municipal) won by a 4–3 score.

During the first 25 years of the Colombian professional football tournament, the difference between the two clubs was notably wide, since Millonarios had already harvested nine league titles and two Copa Colombia titles, while Atlético Nacional had only been league champions in 1954 and spent 19 years without a title until 1973. On 29 April 1951, Millonarios achieved a historic victory in Medellín by a 7–0 score, with five goals by "Maestrico" Antonio Báez and a brace by Alfredo Di Stefano, in the biggest margin of victory between the two clubs in history.

Until the beginning of the decade of the 70s, the only relevant confrontation between both clubs had been in the first Copa Colombia edition (1950–51), in which they met in the third stage of the losers' round and Millonarios knocked Atlético Nacional out after thrashing them 4–0 in the first leg in Bogotá on 5 November 1950 with goals by Adolfo Pedernera, Victor Latuada and two goals by Alfredo Di Stefano. In the second leg played at the San Fernando stadium in Itagüí one week later on 12 November 1950, they drew 1–1 with goals from Robert Flawell for Millonarios and Apolinar Pérez for Atlético Nacional.

In 1971, Atlético Nacional and Millonarios qualified for the final round of the Campeonato Profesional along with Santa Fe and Deportivo Cali, facing each other on the final matchday on 29 December. Millonarios, being one point clear of both Nacional and Santa Fe, only needed to beat the Verdolagas at home in order to claim the title, however Nacional won the match 1–0 and were able to force a tiebreaker final series against Santa Fe, which was eventually won by the latter side. Both teams also fought each other for the league championship in 1972, 1973, 1976 and 1978, with Millonarios winning the league in 1972 and 1978, and Nacional winning it in 1973 and 1976. In 1974 they faced each other in the group stage of the Copa Libertadores, with Millonarios winning both matches against the Verdolagas and advancing to the semi-finals of the competition.

Statistics

Head-to-head

Honours

Records 
Record wins
Atlético Nacional: 
Home: Atlético Nacional 5–0 Millonarios, Estadio Atanasio Girardot, 10 August 2014
Away: Millonarios 1–4 Atlético Nacional, Estadio El Campín, 1976
Millonarios: 
Home: Millonarios 6–0 Atlético Nacional, Estadio El Campín, 12 June 1949
Away: Atlético Nacional 0–7 Millonarios, Estadio Atanasio Girardot, 29 April 1951
Most goals scored in a match
Atlético Nacional 6–4 Millonarios, Estadio Atanasio Girardot, 1978 Apertura

References 

R
Millonarios F.C.
Atlético Nacional